Sir Dermot Renn Davis, OBE (20 November 1928 – 6 June 1997) was a British colonial judge who was Chief Justice of the Solomon Islands, Gibraltar, Tuvalu, and the Falkland Islands.

References 

Falkland Islands judges
Knights Bachelor
1997 deaths
Officers of the Order of the British Empire
Chief justices of Gibraltar
Solomon Islands judges
Chief justices of Tuvalu
1928 births
20th-century Gibraltarian judges